Ontos, officially the Rifle, Multiple 106 mm, Self-propelled, M50, was a U.S. light armored tracked anti-tank vehicle developed in the 1950s.

It mounted six 106 mm manually loaded M40 recoilless rifles as its main armament, which could be fired in rapid succession against single targets to increase the probability of a kill. Although the actual caliber of the main guns was 105 mm, it was designated 106 mm to prevent confusion with the ammunition for the 105 mm M27 recoilless rifle, which the M40 replaced.

It was produced in limited numbers for the U.S. Marines after the U.S. Army cancelled the project. The Marines consistently reported excellent results when they used the Ontos for direct fire support against infantry in numerous battles and operations during the Vietnam War. The American stock of Ontos was largely expended towards the end of the conflict and the Ontos was removed from service in 1969.

Development 
The Ontos (Greek for "thing") project was created to be an air transportable tank destroyer capable of being lifted by the cargo aircraft of the 1950s. This limited the vehicle to a weight between 10 and 20 metric tons. The Ontos also had to use the six-cylinder engine then widely used in the Army's GMC trucks. Allis-Chalmers was awarded a contract on August 12, 1955, for 297 vehicles.

Allis-Chalmers' first vehicle, completed in 1952, was based on the running gear of the M56 Scorpion light anti-tank vehicle. The vehicle mounted a cast steel turret with two arms holding three rifles each. This early model could traverse the turret only about 15 degrees. A second prototype used a new suspension system, new tracks, and a newer turret with about 40 degrees traverse. The vehicle could carry only eighteen rounds for the main guns inside the vehicle due to limited space. Four of the recoilless rifles also had .50 BAT (12.7x77mm) M8C spotting rifles attached, each of which fired a tracer round with the same trajectory as the 106 mm round, and that gave off a flash and puff of white smoke on impact. The spotting rifles were used to line up the 105 mm recoilless rifles with the target. The Ontos also carried a single .30 caliber (7.62 mm) M1919A4 machine gun for anti-infantry use.

The vehicle was taken to the Aberdeen Proving Ground where single rifles had been tested earlier. When all six weapons were fired at once, the back blast from the firing knocked bricks out of a nearby building and knocked the rear windows out of several cars. The prototype and testing stage was completed by 1955, at which point the Army canceled its order.

As an anti-tank vehicle the Ontos had several problems, including a small ammunition load, a very high profile for such a small vehicle, and the need for the crew to exit the vehicle in order to reload the guns, exposing them to enemy fire. Although the Army canceled their order, the Marine Corps were desperate for any anti-tank vehicles they could get, and ordered 297. Production ran from 1955 through 1957. The Marine Corps accepted its first vehicle on 31 October 1956.

Variants and upgrades 
Several variants were also studied. The Utility Vehicle, Tracked, Infantry, T55 was a light Armored personnel carrier (APC), but only two versions of the prototype were built. It proved impractical due to the limited room inside, carrying only five infantry and forcing the driver to lie prone. A "stretched" version known as the Utility Vehicle, Tracked, Infantry, T56 was also built, and while it held a complete eight-man team, their equipment had to be carried on the outside. Neither was considered very useful.

In 1960 there was a brief study made to replace the Ontos's 106 mm rifles with a new 105 mm design that included a revolver-style autoloader. This project was not accepted.

Another proposed upgrade was replacing the GMC engine with a newer Chrysler  V8 engine. This upgrade was implemented and the variant was named Rifle, Multiple 106 mm, Self-propelled, M50A1. However of the 297 vehicles initially accepted by the Marines, only 176 were converted between 1963 and 1965 to this standard.

Service 
While the M50 was designed as a tank destroyer, during the Vietnam War most M50s did not engage enemy armor as the North Vietnamese Army deployed few tanks. The Ontos was therefore more widely used by the US Marines for direct fire support for the infantry in combat, a role that was never emphasized in training or doctrine. Its light armor was effective against small arms but vulnerable to mines and Rocket-propelled grenades. Consequently, many Ontos were deployed in static defense positions.

The relatively light weight of the M50 made it exceptionally mobile for the amount of firepower it carried. In one operation, the Ontos was the only tracked vehicle light enough to cross a pontoon bridge. In the Battle of Huế, Colonel Stanley S. Hughes felt the Ontos was the most effective of all Marine supporting arms. The appearance of an Ontos was sometimes enough to make the enemy break and run, and anecdotal accounts describe the enemy fleeing occupied buildings when an Ontos's spotting round entered a window.

The Ontos units were deactivated in May 1969, and some of the vehicles were handed over to an Army light infantry brigade. They used them until they ran out of spare parts, and then removed the turrets and used them as fixed fortifications. Both these and the rest of the vehicles returned from Vietnam in 1970 and were cut up for scrap, with some of the chassis being sold off to be converted into construction vehicles. Some of the Ontos that were sold to construction companies were later acquired by collectors for restoration.

The Ontos did see use as an anti-tank weapon during the American involvement in the Dominican Civil War: on 29 April 1965 an M50 Ontos and an M48 Patton of the 6th MEU engaged and destroyed two rebel L/60L light tanks, each destroying one. In another instance, an Ontos destroyed an AMX-13.

Preserved vehicles on display 
There are Ontos on display at the following US locations:
 The Patton Museum of Cavalry & Armor in Fort Knox, Kentucky (no longer on display, may have moved with the Armor school to FT Benning).
 The Rock Island Arsenal Museum in Rock Island, Illinois.
 Camp Atterbury, Edinburgh, Indiana.
 The American Military Museum, in El Monte, California has an M50 that is missing its six recoilless rifles.The Aberdeen Proving Ground's Museum in Aberdeen, Maryland has a T165E2, the 19th prototype, though it is not currently on display. The vehicle is currently undergoing a cosmetic restoration.
 Mr. Fred Ropkey, owner of the Ropkey Armor Museum in Crawfordsville, Indiana owns the first prototype T165, a later model Ontos, and a parts machine.
 The National Museum of the Marine Corps in Quantico, Virginia has completed the restoration of an M50A1 Ontos.
 The Museum of The Marine in Jacksonville, North Carolina has an operational M50A1 Ontos which is not on public display.
 There is an M50A1 Ontos on outside display at the Navy Facility at China Lake, California.
 The Marine Corps Air Ground Combat Center Twentynine Palms, California has an M50A1 Ontos on outside display.
 The Military Vehicle Technology Foundation in Portola Valley, California has a T165E1 prototype with the original GM 302ci engine which is currently undergoing a complete operational restoration, and a second prototype T165E2 Ontos.
 The U.S. Army Artillery Museum at Ft. Sill, Oklahoma.
  The Marine Corps Mechanized Museum, Camp Pendleton, displays a M50A1 Ontos that took part in the Battle of Hue.
 There is an M50 Ontos on display outside of the National National Museum of Military Vehicles, in Dubois, WY
Russell Military Museum in Zion, IL.
 The Museum of the American GI in College Station, TX has one undergoing restoration.

See also 
 List of artillery
 List of self-propelled anti-tank guns
 List of artillery of the United States
 G-numbers (SNL G288)

 Similar vehicles 
 Type 60 Self-propelled 106 mm Recoilless Gun

References

Sources

External links 

 Digger History page on the Ontos
 Ontos Anti-Tank Vehicle by Peter Brush

106 mm artillery
Tank destroyers of the United States
Cold War armored fighting vehicles of the United States
Allis-Chalmers Manufacturing Company
Military vehicles introduced in the 1950s